Halopseudomonas pachastrellae is a Gram-negative bacterium found in deep-sea sponges. The type strain is JCM 12285.

References

External links
Type strain of Pseudomonas pachastrellae at BacDive -  the Bacterial Diversity Metadatabase

Pseudomonadales
Bacteria described in 2005